Ihembosi is a town in Anambra State Nigeria, Located 20 miles south-east of the city of Onitsha and 7 miles south of Nnewi. It is under Ekwusigo local government Area of Anambra State. Ihembosi shares boundaries with Okija, Ukpor and Ozubulu. The community is in Anambra South Senatorial Zone of Anambra State and has erosion challenges that have been there for many years, causing loss of lives and properties. The community also celebrates cultural activities like the New Yam festival. Ihembosi has many schools and colleges with a community library that serves the whole community. The community also has participated in as well as benefitted from different literacy and development activities.

Schools in Ihembosi 
Community Secondary School, Ihembosi

Central School, Ihembosi

Ubahu community school

Community Primary School, Ihembosi

Wisdom secondary school

Community development and Engagement in Ihembosi 
Ihembosi community has benefitted from different community information, development and engagement in recent years. In 2019 the Anambra State Library Board, in partnership with Gran Hermano Academy, Awka, organized Cancer work in Ihembosi in commemoration of World Cancer Day celebrated every 4 February throughout the world. The programme was taken to Ihembosi to create awareness on cancer and healthy living.

In another development, Ihembosi community benefits from literacy activities organized by the public libraries, library organizations and non-government organizations (NGO). The secondary schools in Ihembosi joined other schools in Anambra State in a reading and spelling bee competition where they took the third position.

During the 2021 International Literacy Day, Ihembosi Branch Library organized a literacy activities for the school children in the community. The schools and children of Ihembosi have benefitted from one of their sons Dr. Ebuka Onunkwo who donated 10 million naira for the scholarship of 10 university students from his home town Ihembosi. The senior students in Community Secondary School Ihembosi also enjoy the free education through Dr. Ebuka Onunkwo who has been paying their school fee, WAEC and NECO exam since 2009 to date. Over 600 students have benefitted from this gesture.

Erosion Menace in Ihembosi 
Ihembosi is one of the communities in Anambra state that has the challenge of erosion. It is stated that erosion has taken over 12,000 hectares of land at an alarming speed. This was caused by the delay in constructing the Ihembosi – Ozubulu -Ukpor roads which were contracted in 2016 but abandoned until recently. Thus, the uncontrolled flood from the heavy rain causes heavy erosion in the community. Because of this menace, many lives have been lost while properties worth millions of naira are also lost in the erosion. The eight communities that are affected by the flood are Umuabo, Umunakwa, Uhualor, Chiekenta, Otukwe, Onucha, Ubahu and Umuohi. The members of these communities are relocating to other towns. The youngest community, Umuohi has lost 90% of its land to erosion.

References

Anambra, Nigeria

Populated places in Anambra State